Queen Anula of Anuradhapura (? – 42 BC) was the first queen regnant in Sri Lankan history, as well as the first documented female head of state in Asia. Anula initially rose to power as consort of King Chore Naga (also known as Coranaga and Mahanaga), son of King Valagambahu of Anuradhapura. However, in her five-year reign, she poisoned her way through at least four other husbands and consorts, and she eventually governed Rajarata on her own. She should not be confused with the other famous Anula in Sri Lankan history, king Devanampiyatissa's sister-in-law, the first woman in Sri Lanka to be ordained as a bikkhuni. The primary source for Anula, Queen Regnant of Anuradhapura's reign is the Mahavamsa, chapters 34 and 35.

Life
The situation in Sri Lanka immediately before the reign of Anula was extremely unstable. When King Khallata Naga was deposed in a palace coup in 104 BC, his younger brother, Vatta Gamani Abhaya (Valagambahu), overthrew the usurpers and took his dead brother's wife, also called Anula, as his own. He also adopted his nephew, Mahakuli, as his own son.

Valagambahu was on the throne little more than a year when "the Damilas made war upon [him] ... in a battle near Kolambalaka the king was vanquished". It was 16 years before Valagambahu regained the throne, by which time Mahaculika had superseded Coranaga as Valagambahu's preferred heir.

Mahakuli (who reigned as Mahakuli Mahatissa) inherited Valagambahu's throne in 76 BC. Coranaga on the other hand "lived as a rebel"; whether this constituted a struggle for the throne is unknown. If it were, then Coranaga's succession to the throne in 62 BC may well have represented an overthrow of Mahakuli Mahatissa. The Mahavamsa does mention that one of Coranaga's first acts was to destroy 18 temples that had refused him shelter during his time as an outlaw. Coranaga is recorded as having reigned for 12 years, before being poisoned by his consort, "the infamous Anula".

Anula's motives for killing her husband are not known. Coranaga's successor, King Kuda Tissa, is the son of Mahakuli Mahatissa. Kuda means little and, thus, it is possible that the new king was only a child and, effectively, under Anula's control. Kuda Tissa did not live long, "because she [Anula] was enamoured of one of the palace-guards ... now killed Tissa also by poison and gave the government into the hands of that other". From this point onward, the queen eclipsed her titular consorts and became the real power in Anuradhapura. The validity of these claims is debated as the main source for them is the Mahavamsa, and it has been proposed that Queen Anula was simply a victim of the misogyny of the time, and nowhere near as vicious, cunning, or licentious as she was said to be in the chronicle.

Having reigned for four months on her own, Anula was deposed by Mahakuli Mahatissa's second son, Kutakanna Tissa. The Mahavamsa states that Kutakanna Tissa had Anula burned on a funeral pyre. Other sources indicate that Anula was burned alive in the palace where she had committed her murders.

See also
 List of Sri Lankan monarchs
 History of Sri Lanka

References

42 BC deaths
1st-century BC executions
1st-century BC murdered monarchs
A
1st-century BC women rulers
Dethroned monarchs
Executed Sri Lankan women
Filicides
A
Mariticides
Monarchs of Anuradhapura
People executed by burning
Sinhalese queens
Year of birth missing